Tony Valentine is the name of:

Anthony Valentine (1939–2015), English actor
Tony Valentine (baseball) (born 1975), American professional ballplayer (*)